Friedrich Leybold (29 September 1827, Grossköllenbach (Bavaria) – 31 December 1879, Santiago de Chile) was a German-Chilean pharmacist and naturalist.

In 1855 he relocated to Chile as a pharmaceutical industrialist, eventually settling in Santiago de Chile. While in South America, he traveled the Argentine Pampas, publishing "Escursion a las pampas arjentinas : hojas de mi diario, febrero de 1871" as a result. While collecting specimens in the Juan Fernández Archipelago, he discovered the Alejandro Selkirk firecrown (Sephanoides fernandensis leyboldi), a subspecies of hummingbird endemic to Alejandro Selkirk Island. It is now classified as extinct; the last sighting of the subspecies was in 1908. 

He provided descriptions for a number of botanical species and is the taxonomic authority of the family Tecophilaeaceae. The hard fern species Blechnum leyboldtianum (synonym Blechnum blechnoides) is named in his honor.

He was author of a monograph on the botanical order Salicineae that became part of the "Flora Brasiliensis" series.

References 

1827 births
1879 deaths
German pharmacists
German naturalists
19th-century German botanists
19th-century Chilean botanists
Chilean naturalists
People from Dingolfing-Landau
German emigrants to Chile